Varzuga is the rural locality (a selo) in Tersky District of Murmansk Oblast, Russia, located on the Varzuga River. Municipally, it is a part and the administrative center of Varzuga Rural Settlement of Tersky Municipal District. Population: 363 (2010 Census).

History
First mentioned in 1466, Varzuga, along with Umba, is the first documented permanent Russian settlement on the Kola Peninsula, although it is likely that it had been established as early as the second quarter of the 15th century. The 1466 document describes a transaction between Timofey Yermolinich, a resident of Varzuga, and the Solovetsky Monastery, to which he transferred his lands along the Varzuga River and the hunting grounds along the sea coast. Other documents of the 1460s indicate that the residents of Varzuga were the second generation of the original Russian settlers.

From the second half of the 15th century, it served as the seat of Varzuzhskaya Volost (which was abolished in 1841).

By 1563, Varzuga's population grew to 124 homesteads, who were primarily salmon fishers. In the mid-17th century, some of the residents moved out to the coast, where they founded new villages, such as Kuzomen and Tetrino.

In 1861, Varzuga was a part of Kemsky Uyezd of Arkhangelsk Governorate. It had three Orthodox churches and housed its own rural government. The population was 249 (120 male and 129 female); living in 54 homesteads. The 1897 Census counted 793 residents, and the population grew further. By 1910, there were 1,001 people living in 161 homesteads. Educational facilities at the time included a government college and a parochial school.

Culture
An 1850 Pomor izba located in the village was formerly considered to be a heritage site of federal importance, but was excluded from the list in 1997.

References

Sources

External links

Official website of the Government of Murmansk Oblast. Varzuga Rural Settlement, map and information 
Information about Varzuga 
Varzuga: Outpost on the White Sea

Rural localities in Murmansk Oblast
Populated places established in the 1460s